Iron tris(diethyldithiocarbamate) is the coordination complex of iron with diethyldithiocarbamate with the formula Fe(S2CNEt2)3 (Et = ethyl). It is  a black solid that is soluble in organic solvents.

Synthesis, structure, bonding
Iron tris(dithiocarbamate)s are typically are prepared by salt metathesis reactions.

Iron tris(diethyldithiocarbamate) is an octahedral coordination complex of iron(III) with idealized D3 symmetry.

The phenomenon of spin crossover (SCO) was first reported in 1931 by Cambi et al. who observed anomalous magnetic behavior for the tris(N,N-dialkyldithiocarbamatoiron(III) complexes. The magnetism of these complexes are sensitive to the nature of the amine substituents as well as to temperature. This behavior is consistent with an equilibrium between two or more spin states. In the case of Fe(Et2dtc)3, X-ray crystallography reveals that the Fe-S bonds are 231 pm at 79K but 356 pm at 297 K. These data indicate a low-spin configuration at low temperatures and a high spin configuration near room temperature.

Iron tris(dithiocarbamate)s characteristically react with nitric oxide to give Fe(dtc)2NO.  This efficient chemical trapping reaction provides a means to detect NO.

Reflecting the strongly donating properties of dithiocarbamate ligands, iron tris(dithiocarbamate)s oxidize at relatively mild potentials to give isolable iron(IV) derivatives [Fe(S2CNR2)3]+.

Safety
Iron tris(dimethyldithiocarbamate) is the herbicide ferbam, which is poisonous.

See also
 Iron tris(dimethyldithiocarbamate) - a related dimethyldithiocarbamate complex of iron
 Iron bis(diethyldithiocarbamate)
 Cobalt tris(diethyldithiocarbamate)

References

Fungicides
Dithiocarbamates
Iron(III) compounds
Iron complexes